"När vi två blir en" (When we two become one), written by Per Gessle, also known by the refrain's opening line "Jag vill känna din kropp emot min", is a song with lyrics describing teenage love, released as a single on 29 October 1980 by pop group Gyllene Tider. Göran Fritzson wrote the Farfisa intro and the hook. Gyllene Tider also recorded the song with lyrics in English, as "Beating Heart", releasing it as a promotional single on 1 September 1981 using the group name Modern Times.

The song became a major hit in Sweden and Norway, topping the singles charts in both countries. A recording by Miio & Daddy Boastin' became a 2003-2004 hit, topping the Swedish singles chart.

The Gyllene Tider version charted at Svensktoppen for 10 weeks between 14 December 1980 and 1 March 1981, peaking at 2nd position. The Miio & Daddy Boastin' version was tested for Svensktoppen on 3 August 2003, but failed to enter the chart.

Single track listing

När vi två blir en

Side A 
När vi två blir en - 3:05

Side B 
Kärleken är inte blind (men ganska närsynt) - 3:47

Beating Heart

Side A 
Beating Heart (När vi två blir en) - 3.06

Side B 
To Play with Fire (Leka med elden) - 4.57

Charts

Gyllene Tider version

Miio feat. Daddy Boastin' version

References

External links
 Elektroniska tider - När vi två blir en
 Elektroniska tider - Beating Heart
 Information at Svensk mediedatabas
 Information at Svensk mediedatabas

1980 singles
1980 songs
Parlophone singles
Gyllene Tider songs
Number-one singles in Norway
Number-one singles in Sweden
Songs written by Per Gessle
Swedish-language songs